Sambarala Rambabu is a 1970 Indian Telugu-language comedy drama film directed by G. V. R. Seshagiri Rao and produced by T. Mohan Rao. It is a remake of K. Balachander's 1968 Tamil film Ethir Neechal, itself based on his stage play of the same name. The film stars Chalam, Sharada and S. V. Ranga Rao.

Cast 
 Chalam as Rambabu
 Sharada as Lakshmi
 S. V. Ranga Rao as Nair
 Gummadi as Lakshmi's father
 Chandra Mohan as Rambabu's friend
 Relangi
 Padmanabham
 Suryakantham
 Geetanjali
 Hemalatha as Lakshmi's mother
 Manorama
 Mmikkilineni
 Raavi Kondala Rao
 Radha Kumari
 Prabhakar Reddy
 Ch. Krishna Murthy
 Ramachandra Rao
 Bhusarapu
 Modukuri Satyam
 Master Ravi
 Master Hari

Production 
Sambarala Rambabu was directed by G. V. R. Seshagiri Rao and produced by T. Mohan Rao under Sri Ramana Chitra. It is a remake of the 1968 Tamil film Ethir Neechal written and directed by K. Balachander, itself based on his stage play of the same name. S. V. Ranga Rao was cast as the cook Nair. Raman, who played the role on stage, was hired to supervise the shoot. During the filming of the song "Sedi Ketto", Raman suggested that Ranga Rao dance, but the latter refused. After Raman told Ranga Rao that he only had to do a few comic moves, he assented, and the segment attained popularity. Cinematography was handled by Bhaskar Rao Polu and editing by Anki Reddy Veluri.

Soundtrack 
The soundtrack of the film was composed by V. Kumar while the lyrics were written by Rajasri. The playback singers were P. Susheela, P. Leela, K. Jamuna Rani, Swarna, P. B. Sreenivas, S. P. Balasubrahmanyam, Pitapuram Nageshwara Rao, J. V. Raghavulu and Madhavapedhi Satyam. The songs "Maamaa Chandamama Vinaraavaa" and "Vinnara Vinnara Ee Vintanu Vinnara" attained popularity.

References

External links 
 

1970 films
1970s Telugu-language films
Indian comedy-drama films
1970 comedy-drama films
Telugu remakes of Tamil films
Indian black-and-white films
Films about orphans
Indian films based on plays
Films with screenplays by K. Balachander
Films scored by V. Kumar
Films based on adaptations
1970 comedy films
1970 drama films